Backlund is a worn lunar impact crater on the far side of the Moon, beyond the eastern limb, astride the southern rim of the walled plain Pasteur, to the west of the crater Hilbert. Further to the west-southwest is Sklodowska. Backlund's north and south ends are more worn and eroded than the intervening stretches. The interior floor is relatively flat, with the usual accompaniment of tiny impact craters marking the surface.

Satellite craters
By convention these features are identified on lunar maps by placing the letter on the side of the crater midpoint that is closest to Backlund.

See also 
 Asteroid 856 Backlunda

References

External links
 

Impact craters on the Moon